L-galactonolactone dehydrogenase (galactonolactone dehydrogenase, L-galactono-gamma-lactone dehydrogenase, L-galactono-gamma-lactone:ferricytochrome-c oxidoreductase, GLDHase, GLDase) is an enzyme with systematic name L-galactono-1,4-lactone:ferricytochrome-c oxidoreductase. This enzyme catalyses the following chemical reaction

 (1) L-galactono-1,4-lactone + 2 ferricytochrome c  L-ascorbate + 2 ferrocytochrome c + 2 H+
 (2) L-ascorbate + 2 ferricytochrome c  L-dehydroascorbate +  2 ferrocytochrome c + 2 H+ (spontaneous)

This enzyme catalyses the final step in the biosynthesis of L-ascorbic acid in plants and other photosynthetic eukaryotes.

References

External links 
 

EC 1.3.2